Rochia is a genus of  sea snail, a marine gastropod mollusk in the family Tegulidae.

Species
 Rochia conus (Gmelin, 1791)
 Rochia elata (Lamarck, 1822)
 Rochia hirasei (Pilsbry, 1904)
 Rochia magnifica (Poppe, 2004)
 Rochia maxima (Koch, 1844)
 Rochia nilotica (Linnaeus, 1767)
 Rochia virgata (Gmelin, 1791)
Synonyms
 Rochia acutangula (Anton, 1838): synonym of Rochia conus (Gmelin, 1791)
 Rochia maximus (Koch, 1844): synonym of Rochia maxima (Koch, 1844) (wrong gender agreement of specific epithet)
 Rochia niloticus (Linnaeus, 1767): synonym of Rochia nilotica (Linnaeus, 1767) (wrong gender agreement of specific epithet)

References

External links
 Gray, J. E. (1857). Guide to the systematic distribution of Mollusca in the British Museum. Part I. [Gastropoda. British Museum, London, xii + 230 pp]
 Gray, J. E. (1842). Molluscs. Pp. 48-92, in: Synopsis of the contents of the British Museum, edition 44. British Museum. London. iv + 308 p.
 Williams, S. T. (2012). Advances in molecular systematics of the vetigastropod superfamily Trochoidea. Zoologica Scripta. 41(6): 571-595

Tegulidae